Donnington Castle is a ruined medieval castle, situated in the small village of Donnington, just north of the town of Newbury in the English county of Berkshire. It was founded by Sir Richard Abberbury the Elder in 1386 and was bought by Thomas Chaucer before the castle was taken under royal control during the Tudor period. During the First English Civil War the castle was held by the royalist Sir John Boys and withstood an 18-month siege; after the garrison eventually surrendered, Parliament voted to demolish Donnington Castle in 1646. Only the gatehouse survives. The site is a scheduled monument under the care of English Heritage.

History

The manor of Donnington had been owned by the Adderbury family since 1292, 
Donnington Castle was built by its original owner, Sir Richard Abberbury the Elder, under a licence granted by Richard II in 1386. The surviving castle gatehouse dates from this time. In 1398, the castle was sold to Thomas Chaucer, son of the poet Geoffrey Chaucer, as a residence for his daughter Alice, who later became Duchess of Suffolk.
The Duke of Suffolk William De La Pole made Donnington his occasional residence, and considerably enlarged the buildings.

This family later fell out with the Tudor monarchs, and the castle became a royal property. In 1514 it was given to Charles Brandon, 1st Duke of Suffolk. Though Brandon appears to have stayed at the Donnington Castle in 1516, by the time the castle and manor returned to the Crown in 1535 the structure was in a state of decay. King Henry VIII, Edward VI, and Queen Elizabeth I visited Donnington Castle, in 1539, 1552, and 1568 respectively.

In 1590 Elizabeth I granted keepership to Elizabeth Cooke (Lady Russell), the first woman to hold such a title in England.
In 1600, Elizabeth I gave the castle and surrounding manor to Charles Howard, 1st Earl of Nottingham. Howard took possession in September 1603 and Russell disputed his rights. By the time the English Civil War broke out in 1643, the castle was owned by the Parliamentarian John Packer family but after the First Battle of Newbury it was taken for the King, Charles I, and held by Sir John Boys. They quickly enhanced the castle's defences by adding earthworks in a star shape to provide gun emplacements. Parliamentarians laid siege to the castle in October 1644 and the garrison held out for 18 months. With permission from the king, Boys surrendered the castle in April 1646 and was allowed to leave with all his men.

In 1646 Parliament voted to demolish the castle; only the gatehouse was left standing though the 17th-century earthworks can still be seen. The castle is now in the care of English Heritage and is a scheduled ancient monument number 1007926.

The castle stayed in the Packer family until the mid 18th century, when Robert Packer married Mary Winchcombe, and the property passed into the Winchcombe family tree. From 1833 to 1881 the manor and castle was owned by Winchcombe Henry Howard Hartley,

Layout

Donnington Castle was originally built in a roughly rectangular form, though the west facade projected outwards irregularly. It was enclosed by a curtain wall, with a round tower at each of the four corners. Roughly halfway along the two walls running from west to east were two square towers. The courtyard enclosed by the curtain walls would probably have contained a hall, kitchens, and accommodation for guests.

During the Civil War star-shaped defences were built around the castle to facilitate gun emplacements. Only the gatehouse, crested by battlements, survived the castle's destruction in 1646; standing three storeys high, it measures  internally.

In Popular Culture
Donnington Castle appears in an episodee of The Saint called 'Little Girl Lost', first broadcast on 2 December 1966.

The castle appeared in the Children's Film Foundation feature A Hitch in Time (1978), starring Patrick Troughton.

The twin-towered gatehouse is depicted on the cover of the compilation album The Best of Tenpole Tudor : Swords of a Thousand Men (2001).

Gallery

See also
Castles in Great Britain and Ireland
List of castles in England

References

External links

 Donnington Castle - Newbury History
 English Heritage page on Donnington Castle
 Investigation History

Castles in Berkshire
Grade I listed buildings in Berkshire
Grade I listed castles
English Heritage sites in Berkshire
Ruins in Berkshire
Scheduled monuments in Berkshire